Charlie Flannagan (born 24 October 1933) is a former Australian rules footballer who played with Richmond in the Victorian Football League (VFL).

References

External links

1933 births
Living people
Australian rules footballers from Victoria (Australia)
Richmond Football Club players